The 1974–75 season was Liverpool Football Club's 83rd season in existence and their 13th consecutive season in the First Division. Liverpool had a trophyless first season under the guidance of Bob Paisley, who took over as manager following the retirement of Bill Shankly after nearly 15 years at the helm. They did finish second in the First Division behind champions Derby County, in a record-tight season that saw the top ten teams separated by less than ten points. A defeat in the penultimate round against newcomers Middlesbrough cost Liverpool a ninth league title.

It did however beat the club record for biggest victory, eclipsing Strømsgodset from Norway by 11–0 in the Cup Winners' Cup.

Squad

Goalkeepers
  Ray Clemence
  Frank Lane
  Peter McDonnell

Defenders
  Emlyn Hughes
  Brian Kettle
  Chris Lawler
  Alec Lindsay
  John McLaughlin
  Phil Neal
  Tommy Smith
  Phil Thompson

Midfielders
  Ian Callaghan
  Jimmy Case
  Peter Cormack
  Brian Hall
  Steve Heighway
  Ray Kennedy
  Terry McDermott
  Peter Spiring
  Max Thompson

Attackers
  Phil Boersma
  Derek Brownbill
  David Fairclough
  Kevin Keegan
  Kevin Kewley
  John Toshack
  Alan Waddle

League table

Results

First Division

FA Charity Shield

FA Cup

Football League Cup

European Cup Winners' Cup

References
 LFC History.net – 1974–75 season
 Liverweb - 1974-75 Season

Liverpool F.C. seasons
Liverpool